Shivagange Mahathme is a 1964 Indian Kannada-language film, directed by Govindaiah and produced by J. C. Thimmarayappa. The film stars Rajkumar, Udaykumar, K. S. Ashwath and Balakrishna. The film has musical score by G. K. Raghu.

Cast

Rajkumar as Sukumara
Udaykumar
K. S. Ashwath
Balakrishna
Rathnakar
T. Subba Rao
Shyamsundar
Sathyanarayana
Kuppuraj
Hanumantha Rao
M. Basappa
Harini
M. Jayashree
Rajasree
H. P. Saroja
B. Jaya as Meenakshi
Sujatha

Soundtrack
The music was composed by Raghu.

References

External links
 

1964 films
1960s Kannada-language films
1970s Kannada-language films